
Gmina Sękowa is a rural gmina (administrative district) in Gorlice County, Lesser Poland Voivodeship, in southern Poland, on the Slovak border.

Villages
Gmina Sękowa contains the villages and settlements of Banica, Bartne, Bodaki, Czarne, Jasionka, Krzywa, Lipna, Małastów, Męcina Mała, Męcina Wielka, Nieznajowa, Owczary, Pętna, Radocyna, Ropica Górna, Sękowa, Siary, Wapienne and Wołowiec.

Neighbouring gminas
Gmina Sękowa is bordered by the town of Gorlice and by the gminas of Dębowiec, Gorlice, Krempna, Lipinki, Osiek Jasielski and Uście Gorlickie. It also borders Slovakia.

References
 Polish official population figures 2006

See also

Sekowa
Gorlice County